Pacesetter Novels are a collection of 130 works of popular fiction written by notable African authors, published by Macmillan. The series was started in 1977, with the first book being Director! by Agbo Areo.

Writing style 
The Pacesetters series was characterised by adventures of falling in love, ethno-religious conflicts, tragic tales of woe, cautionary tales, and "rags to riches" (and sometimes back to rags!) tales.

Book cover artwork 
The book covers usually featured very garish pictures that served to illustrate the main theme of that particular novel.

Authors 
The authors of the books are noted African novelists and writers. Some of the more celebrated of these are Buchi Emecheta, Barbara Kimenye  and Helen Ovbiagele.

Titles 

1. A Picture Of Innocence – A. Mhlope 
2. Agony In Her Voice – Peter Katuliiba
3. Angel Of Death – Nandi Dlovu
4. Anything For Money – Akinbolu Babarinsa
5. The Betrayer – Sam A. Adewoye
6. Bitter Consequences – Osman Conteh
7. Bittersweet – Yéma L. Hunter
8. The Black Temple – Mohmed T. Garba
9. Blackmailers – Joseph Mangut
10. Bloodbath At Lobster Close† – D. Ighavini
11. Bonds Of Love – Hope Dube
12. The Border Runners – James Irungu & James Shimanyula
13. Camera Never Lies – A. Mhlope
14. Cherished Dreams – Mugarra Adyeeri
15. Child Of The Rainbow –  Anthony Kwamlah Johnson
16. Child Of War – Ben Chirasha
17. Christmas In The City – Afari Assan
18. Circle Of Betrayal – James Irungu
19. Coup! – Kalu Okpi
20. Cross-Fire – Kalu Okpi
21. The Cyclist* – Philip Phil-Ebosie
22. Danger Express – D. Msere
23. Dangerous Inheritance – Chuma Nwokolo
24. Dangerous Waters – Maurice Sotabinda
25. Dead Of Night – Philip Phil-Ebosie
26. Deadly News – Prim Nga'ab
27. Dealers In Death – Victor Thorpe
28. Death Is Woman – Dickson Ighavini
29. Dela Boya-African Detective – Kojo Akwa
30. The Delinquent – Mohammed Sule
31. Desert Storm – Hope Dube
32. Director! – Agbo Areo
33. Double Dating – Walije Gondwe
34. Double Trouble – Osman Conteh
35. A Dream Called September – Christine Botchway
36. The Equatorial Assignment – David G. Maillu
37. Europeans Only? – George Mason
38. Evbu My Love – Helen Ovbiagele
39. The Extortionist – Chuma Nwokolo
40. Felicia – Rosina Umelo
41. Finding Francis – Damian Asabuhi
42. Finger Of Suspicion – Rosina Umelo
43. For Better For Worse – Osman P. Conteh
44. For Mbatha And Rabeka – David G. Maillu
45. Forever Yours – Helen Ovbiagele
46. Forgive Me Maryam – Mohmed T. Garba
47. Francie Molala and the Mercedes Affair – D. Fitzgibbons
48. A Fresh Start – Helen Ovbiagele
49. Frozen Fire* – Victor Thorpe
50. Give Me Money – B. Mtobwa
51. Gun Merchant – Kwasi Koranteng 
52. Harvest Of Love – Sam Aryeetey
53. Have Mercy – Joseph Mangut
54. The Hopeful Lovers* – Agbo Areo
55. The Hornet's Nest – Jill Inyundo 
56. The Infamous Act – Mohammed Sule
57. The Instrument – Victor Thorpe
58. A Kind Of Marriage – Buchi Emecheta
59. The Last Aloe – R. Wooding
60. Life Is A Lottery — Sotabinda
61. The Lost Generation – J. Irungu
62. Love – Kalu Okpi
63. Love Letters – Rosina Umelo
64. Love Match: Imperfect Partners – Walije Gondwe
65. Love On The Rocks – Andrew Sesinyi
66. Love's Dilemma – Walije Gondwe
67. Mark Of The Cobra – Valentine Alily
68. The Mating Game – Barbara Kimenye
69. Meet Me In Conakry – Sheriff Sarr
70. The Money Doublers – Maurice Sotabinda
71. The Money Road – Miriam Nkhana
72. Moses and the Gunman – B. Kimenye
73. Naira Power – Buchi Emecheta
74. Nanasi Girl – Damian Asabuhi
75. The Night Of the Full Moon – Muheki-Rushedgé
76. On The Road – Kalu Okpi
77. Operation Rhino – James Irungu & James Shimanyula
78. The Other Side Of Town – Sam Aryeetey
79. Pains Of A Maid – Sarah Mkhonza
80. Poisoned Bait – James Ngumy
81. The Politician* – Kalu Okpi
82. Possessed! – Atu Yalley
83. The President’s Son – Kwasi Koranteng
84. Race Against Rats – Nandi Dlovu
85. Rassie – Andrew Sesinyi
86. Remember Death – Gladstone Meena
87. Rich Girl, Poor Boy – Bode Osanyin
88. The Runaway Bride – Barbara Kimenye
89. The Schemers – Helen Ovbiagele
90. Sea Running – Tish Farrell 
91. Second-Hand Love – Walije Gondwe
92. Secret Blood – John Chitambo
93. Shadow Of A Dream – Hope Dube
94. Shadow Of Death – Jackson Katondwaci
95. Shameful Sacrifice – Richard Anieke
96. Sisi – Yemi Sikuade
97. Small Affairs – Kenneth Rowley
98. The Smugglers* – Kalu Okpi
99. Something To Hide – Rosina Umelo
100. South African Affair* – Kalu Okpi
101. Spears Down – Christine Botchway
102. State Secret – Hope Dube
103. Stone of Vengeance – Victor Thorpe
104. Stop Press: Murder! – Mohmed T. Garba
105. The Stranger Son – Ruth Reeves
106. Sunset At Noon – A. Johnson
107. Sweet Revenge – Victor A. Ulojiofor
108. Symphony of Destruction – Sunday D. Adebomi
109. Teardrops At Sunset – Richard Akoji
110. Tell Me No More – Sensenjani Lukhele
111. The Legacy – Kwasi Koranteng 
112. Thorns Of Life – David G. Maillu
113. To Have & To Hold – Shelley Davidow
114. Tobacco Smoke – Kwasi Koranteng
115. Too Cold For Comfort – Jide Oguntoye
116. Too Young To Die* – Omondi Mak'Oloo
117. The Treasure – Peter Katuliiba
118. Truth Will Out – Dede Kamkondo
119. The Undesirable Element – Mohammed Sule
120. Vicious Circle – Alexander Kanengoni
121. Wages Of Sin – Ibe Oparandu
122. What The Future Holds – Sarah Mkhonza
123. When Love Dies* – Gladstone Meena
124. Where Children Play – Christine Botchway
125. Who Killed Mohtta? – Edison N. Yongai
126. Who Really Cares – Helen Ovbiagele
127. Women For Sale – Joseph Mangut
128. The Worshippers – Victor Thorpe
129. You Never Know – Helen Ovbiagele
130. Zero Hour – Ben Mtobwa

NB. † No longer exists * Out of print

References

External links 
 Pacesetter Novels website 
 "Pacesetters", Sahara Reporters, 13 May 2010.

Series of books
African novels